Parker Siegfried (born February 17, 1997) is a retired American professional soccer player who played as a goalkeeper.

Career

Youth, college & amateur 
Siegfried played with the Columbus Crew academy prior to playing college soccer at Ohio State University in 2015. He redshirted in 2015, before going on to make 72 appearances for the team and achieving 18 shutouts. During his time with the Buckeyes, Siegfried was named Big Ten All-Freshman Team in 2016, was a two-time Academic All-Big Ten in 2016 and 2017, and a Four-time OSU Scholar-Athlete.

In 2017 and 2018, Siegfried played with NPSL side Asheville City. He went on to make 21 regular season appearances for the club.

Professional

MLS SuperDraft
On January 13, 2020, Siegfried was selected 74th overall in the 2020 MLS SuperDraft by New York City FC. However, he did not sign the club.

South Georgia Tormenta
On April 8, 2020, Siegfried signed with USL League One side South Georgia Tormenta. He was released by Tormenta on September 8, 2020 without having made a first team appearance for the club.

Detroit City
Immediately following his release, it was announced that Siegfried had joined Detroit City for their first full season in the National Independent Soccer Association. He went on to help the club win the NISA Fall Championship.

Louisville City
On March 17, 2021, Siegfried signed with USL Championship side Louisville City FC following a success trial with the club.

On April 15, 2021, Major League Soccer side Sporting Kansas City brought in Siegfried on a season-long loan following an injury crisis among their goalkeepers. Kansas City acquired his Major League Soccer rights from New York City FC in exchange for a 3rd round 2023 MLS SuperDraft pick. However, he returned to Louisville in late May.

Following the 2022 season, Siegfried retired from playing soccer to pursue other career opportunities outside the sport.

References

External links 
 Parker Siegfried Ohio State University bio
 

1997 births
Living people
American soccer players
Association football goalkeepers
Detroit City FC players
Louisville City FC players
National Independent Soccer Association players
National Premier Soccer League players
New York City FC draft picks
Ohio State Buckeyes men's soccer players
People from Granville, Ohio
Soccer players from Ohio
Sporting Kansas City players
Tormenta FC players
USL League One players